KNST (790 AM) is a commercial radio station in Tucson, Arizona, airing a news/talk radio format. The station is owned by iHeartMedia and serves Greater Tucson, including the suburbs of Marana, Oro Valley, Green Valley, Sahuarita, Sierra Vista, and Vail.  KNST's studios and offices are located north of Downtown Tucson along Oracle Road, while the transmitter site is in West Tucson, off North Silverbell Road.

Programming
KNST's lineup parallels most iHeart talk stations.  Weekdays begin with The Morning Ritual with Garret Lewis, followed by syndicated shows hosted by Clay Travis and Buck Sexton who replaced the Late Rush Limbaugh Sean Hannity, Mark Levin, Glenn Beck, Coast to Coast AM with George Noory and This Morning, America's First News with Gordon Deal.  Weekend shows focus on health, money, law, computers and other topics.  Some weekend programs are paid brokered programming.  Syndicated weekend hosts include Glenn Beck, Bill Handel, Ric Edelman, Kim Komando, Bill Cunningham and an Arizona gardening and home repair show, Rosie Romero's Rosie On The House (originating from its flagship station KTAR-FM in Phoenix).  Most hours begin with world and national news from Fox News Radio.

Because Arizona does not observe daylight saving time, syndicated programs air on a one-hour recorded delay from mid-March to early November, so they can be heard in their usual time slots on KNST.

History

KCEE history

790 AM in Tucson was originally the home of KCEE, which signed on October 1, 1958.  It was owned by the Associated Broadcasters of Arizona and first began as a daytimer with only 250 watts of power.  By the early 1960s, the station got a boost to 5,000 watts by day, 500 watts at night, its current power.

In 1966, Strauss Broadcasting purchased KCEE.  In 1967, Strauss added an FM station, 96.1 KCEE-FM (now KLPX).  At first the FM station simulcast AM 790, but later switched to beautiful music.  In the 1970s, 790 KCEE was a full service station, playing middle of the road music and airing NBC Radio News.  In 1980, KCEE was sold to a company calling itself "790, Incorporated."  The FM station was sold to Lotus Communications, becoming KTKT-FM, a companion to AM 990 KTKT.

KNST history
The 940 frequency in Tucson first went on the air on August 10, 1963 as KHOS.  From its sign on until the late 1970s, it was a country music station.   From 1978 to 1981, it was soft rock KMGX "Magic 94."  But with music listening moving to FM radio, the station's owner, Grabet Radio Enterprises, wanted to make a change.  In July 1981, AM 940 switched to a news/talk format, taking the KNST call letters.  A few years later, 940 AM was sold to Nationwide Communications, a subsidiary of Nationwide Insurance. KNST carried talk shows from the ABC Talk Radio Network, broadcasting on 940 AM until it was moved to 790 AM on April 4, 1993.  The 790 frequency has more power and a larger coverage area.  Today, 940 AM is the home of KGMS, a Christian radio station.

Expanded Band assignment

On March 17, 1997 the Federal Communications Commission (FCC) announced that eighty-eight stations had been given permission to move to newly available "Expanded Band" transmitting frequencies, ranging from 1610 to 1700 kHz, with KNST authorized to move from 790 to 1700 kHz. However, the station never procured the Construction Permit needed to implement the authorization, so the expanded band station was never built.

Later history

Nationwide later sold its Tucson stations, including KNST, to Tucson Radio Partners, which in turn was absorbed by Prism Radio and then Clear Channel Communications in the 1990s.
KNST was the radio flagship station for University of Arizona men's basketball and football play-by-play from about 1984 until 2004, when the broadcasts moved to all-sports KCUB, branded as "1290 The Source".

References

External links
 Official website

 FCC History Cards for KNST (covering 1956–1980 as KCTU / KRTU / KCEE)

NST
News and talk radio stations in the United States
Radio stations established in 1963
1963 establishments in Arizona
IHeartMedia radio stations